The Memsie Stakes is a Melbourne Racing Club Group 1 Thoroughbred horse race held under weight for age conditions, for horses aged three years old and upwards, over a distance of 1400 metres. It is held at Caulfield Racecourse, Melbourne, Australia as a lead in to the Spring Racing Carnival.  Total prize money for the race is A$1,000,000.

History
The race is often used as a lead-up race by good horses preparing for the longer feature races such as the Caulfield Cup, Cox Plate and Melbourne Cup. Such horses typically compete against less glamorous, and usually fitter, sprinter-milers who have been trained specifically for this race. Speed and fitness seem to prevail over class about half the time, as can be seen in the list of recent winners.

As the race comes early in the Spring, it will often indicate how well a horse has come back after its customary winter spell. There is sometimes just as much interest in the horses running on well from the back of the field, as there is in the actual winner. A good run by a staying horse in this race is often a good indicator of a successful Spring Carnival to come.

The Memsie Stakes is a virtually identical race to the P B Lawrence Stakes, another 1,400 metre weight-for-age race run at Caulfield usually earlier in August except that this is the first Group 1 in the racing season in Victoria.

The list of previous winners of the race contain recent champions, including Sincero, So You Think, Weekend Hussler, Makybe Diva, Sunline, Naturalism, Rancho Ruler, Manikato, and famous champions from the 20th century Galilee, Rising Fast, Comic Court, Lord (four times), Ajax (three times) and Phar Lap.

Distance
1899 -1 mile (~ 1600m)
1900–1980 - 1 miles (~ 1800m)
1971 - 1 mile (~ 1600m)
1972–1979 – 1600 metres
1980 onwards - 1400 metres

Grade
1899–1978 - Principal Race
1979–2012 - Group 2
2013 onwards Group 1

Venue
 1899 - 1983 - Caulfield Racecourse
 1984 - Sandown Racecourse
 1985–present - Caulfield Racecourse

1951 & 1954 Racebooks

Winners

 2022 - Snapdancer
 2021 - Behemoth
 2020 - Behemoth
 2019 - Scales of Justice
 2018 - Humidor
 2017 - Vega Magic
 2016 - Black Heart Bart
 2015 - Boban
 2014 - Dissident
 2013 - Atlantic Jewel
 2012 - Sincero
 2011 - King's Rose
 2010 - So You Think
 2009 - Mic Mac
 2008 - Weekend Hussler
 2007 - Miss Finland
 2006 - El Segundo
 2005 - Makybe Diva
 2004 - Regal Roller
 2003 - Le Zagaletta
 2002 - Magical Miss
 2001 - Sunline
 2000 - Sunline
 1999 - Sir Boom
 1998 - Dane Ripper
 1997 - Tarnpir Lane
 1996 - Sir Boom
 1995 - Island Morn
 1994 - Bundy Lad
 1993 - Palace Reign
 1992 - Naturalism
 1991 - Redelva
 1990 - The Phantom
 1989 - Almurtajaz
 1988 - Rancho Ruler
 1987 - Rubiton
 1986 - Dazzling Duke
 1985 - Delightful Belle
 1984 - King Delamere
 1983 - Red Tempo
 1982 - Manikato
 1981 - Silver Bounty
 1980 - Tolhurst
 1979 - Arbre Chene
 1978 - Crepellox
 1977 - Wave King
 1976 - Plush
 1975 - Battle Sign
 1974 - Nandalie Lass
 1973 - Zambari
 1972 - Longfella
 1971 - Cyron
 1970 - Ahjay
 1969 - Fileur
 1968 - Galilee
 1967 - Grey Spirit
 1966 - Yangtze
 1965 - Yangtze
 1964 - Future
 1963 - Coppelius
 1962 - Webster
 1961 - Lord
 1960 - Lord
 1959 - Lord
 1958 - Lord
 1957 - Syntax
 1956 - Rising Fast
 1955 - Coppice
 1954 - Coppice
 1953 - Jovial Lad
 1952 - Peshawar
 1951 - Ellerslie
 1950 - Comic Court
 1949 - Comic Court
 1948 - Lungi
 1947 - Attley
 1946 - Noble Prince
 1945 - Tranquil Star
 1944 - Lawrence
 1943 - Sun Valley
 1942 - David Innis
 1941 - Lugano
 1940 - Ajax
 1939 - Ajax
 1938 - Ajax
 1937 - Black Mac
 1936 - †Charles Fox / Valiant Chief 
 1935 - Hall Mark 
 1934 - Waltzing Lily
 1933 - Waltzing Lily
 1932 - High Brae
 1931 - Phar Lap
 1930 - Wise Force
 1929 - Highland
 1928 - Gothic
 1927 - Royal Charter
 1926 - Heroic
 1925 - Heroic
 1924 - Englefield
 1923 - Maid Of The Mist
 1922 - Eurythmic
 1921 - Eurythmic
 1920 - Eurythmic
 1919 - Artilleryman
 1918 - Eusebius
 1917 - Harriet Graham
 1916 - Price Bardolph
 1915 - Traquette
 1914 - Aleconner
 1913 - Uncle Sam
 1912 - Captain White
 1911 - Flaith
 1910 - Blairgour
 1909 - Knox
 1908 - Pink ‘Un
 1907 - Subterranean
 1906 - Retrencher
 1905 - Bobadil
 1904 - Wingaroon
 1903 - Billali
 1902 - Seclusion
 1901 - Hymettus
 1900 - †Eiridsdale / Massinissa 
 1899 - Veneda

† Dead heat

See also
 List of Australian Group races
 Group races

References

Caulfield Racecourse
Group 1 stakes races in Australia